EWS Arena (formerly Hohenstaufenhalle) is an indoor sporting arena located in Göppingen, Germany.  The capacity of the arena is 5,600 people.  It hosts the home matches of women's and men's Handball Bundesliga handball teams of Frisch Auf Göppingen. In its previous building, it hosted six team handball matches for the 1972 Summer Olympics in Munich. It was opened in 1967 and rebuilt and enlarged between 2007 and 2009.

References

1972 Summer Olympics official report. Volume 1. Part 1. p. 121.
1972 Summer Olympics official report. Volume 3. p. 375.

External links 
Official website

Venues of the 1972 Summer Olympics
Handball venues in Germany
Indoor arenas in Germany
Olympic handball venues
Buildings and structures in Göppingen (district)
Sports venues in Baden-Württemberg